Anna O'Flanagan (born 18 February 1990) is an Ireland women's field hockey international. She was a member of the Ireland team that played in the 2018 Women's Hockey World Cup final. O'Flanagan has also won Irish Senior Cup and Women's Irish Hockey League titles with UCD.

Early years and education
O'Flanagan is originally from Rathgar and attended Rathgar Junior School. Between 2002 and 2008 she also attended Muckross Park College. Between 2008 and 2013 she attended University College Dublin and graduated with a Bachelor of Law with Economics.

Club career

Early years
O'Flanagan played women's field hockey for both Rathgar Junior School and Muckross Park College. In 2002 she captained the Rathgar Junior School girls team.

Hermes
In 2008, when still a schoolgirl at Muckross Park College, O'Flanagan was a member of the  Hermes team that won the All-Ireland Ladies' Club Championships. Her teammates at Hermes included Chloe Watkins, Nicola Evans, and Deirdre Duke.

UCD
O'Flanagan began playing for UCD in 2011. She subsequently played for UCD in three successive Irish Senior Cup finals. In 2012, along with Dora Gorman, Chloe Watkins and Deirdre Duke, she was a member of the UCD team that defeated Loreto 3–2. O'Flanagan scored UCD's third goal in the final. UCD were finalists again in 2013 but this time O'Flanagan finished on the losing side as they lost 3–2 to Railway Union. O'Flanagan scored again in the 2014 final as UCD defeated Pembroke Wanderers 2–0. In 2013–14, together with  Katie Mullan, Gillian Pinder, Deirdre Duke, Nicola Evans and Emily Beatty, O'Flanagan was also a member of the UCD team that won the  Women's Irish Hockey League. O'Flanagan also played and scored for UCD in the 2015 EuroHockey Club Champions Cup.

Hermes-Monkstown
In 2015–16, together with Chloe Watkins and Nicola Evans, O'Flanagan was a member of the Hermes team that won the Women's Irish Hockey League title and the EY Champions Trophy. In the EY Champions Trophy final,  O'Flanagan scored twice in a 3–1 win over Pegasus. In 2016 Hermes merged with Monkstown and the ladies team subsequently played as Hermes-Monkstown. O'Flanagan subsequently played for Hermes-Monkstown in the 2017 EY Champions Trophy final and in the 2017 EuroHockey Club Champions Cup.

Hoofdklasse
In 2017 O'Flanagan took a break from her legal career to prepare for the 2018 Women's Hockey World Cup. Together with Chloe Watkins, she played for HC Bloemendaal in the Hoofdklasse in the Netherlands. O'Flanagan was coached by Teun de Nooijer and helped Bloemendaal win the Gold Cup. In 2018 she switched to Pinoké.

Ireland international
O'Flanagan made her debut for Ireland in July 2010 against Scotland. In April 2011 she scored her first goal for Ireland against France. In March 2015 O'Flanagan was a member of the Ireland team that won a 2014–15 Women's FIH Hockey World League Round 2 tournament hosted in Dublin, defeating Canada in the final after a penalty shoot-out. In May 2015 she made her 100th appearance for Ireland and marked the occasion by scoring in a 3–1 win against Canada. In January 2017 she was also a member of the Ireland team that won a 2016–17 Women's FIH Hockey World League Round 2 tournament in Kuala Lumpur, defeating Malaysia 3–0 in the final. 
O'Flanagan has been a regular goalscorer for Ireland. She scored 12 goals at the Kuala Lumpur tournament, including one in the final, which saw her pass the 50 mark. She was also the leading goalscorer at the tournament.

O'Flanagan represented Ireland at the 2018 Women's Hockey World Cup and was a prominent member of the team that won the silver medal. She featured in all of Ireland's games throughout the tournament, including the pool games against the United States, India, and England, the quarter-final against India, the semi-final against Spain and the final against the Netherlands. During the tournament O'Flanagan scored twice. On 26 July 2018 she scored in the group game against India, securing a 1–0 win for Ireland and a place in the quarter-finals. On 4 August 2018 she also scored in the semi-final against Spain. This was her 65th international goal which saw her become Ireland's joint all-time top scorer, along with Lynsey McVicker. She was subsequently named player of the match.

Occupation
Together with Lizzie Colvin, Nicola Evans, Deirdre Duke and Gillian Pinder, O'Flanagan was one of five lawyers in the Ireland squad at the 2018 Women's Hockey World Cup. O'Flanagan is a former McCann FitzGerald trainee and is a qualified solicitor.

Honours
Ireland
Women's Hockey World Cup
Runners Up: 2018
Women's FIH Hockey World League
Winners: 2015 Dublin, 2017 Kuala Lumpur
Women's FIH Hockey Series
Runners Up: 2019 Banbridge
Women's Hockey Champions Challenge I
Runners Up: 2014
Women's Four Nations Cup
Runners Up: 2017
UCD
Women's Irish Hockey League
Winners: 2013–14
Irish Senior Cup
Winners: 2011–12, 2013–14
Runners Up: 2012–13
Hermes/Hermes-Monkstown
Women's Irish Hockey League
Winners: 2015–16
EY Champions Trophy
Winners: 2015-16
Runners Up: 2016–17
All-Ireland Ladies' Club Championships
Winners: 2008
HC Bloemendaal
Gold Cup
Winners: 2017

References

External links
 Anna O'Flanagan at Hockey Ireland
 
 
 
 

1990 births
Living people
Irish female field hockey players
Ireland international women's field hockey players
UCD Ladies' Hockey Club players
Monkstown Hockey Club players
HC Bloemendaal players
Women's Irish Hockey League players
Field hockey players from County Dublin
Expatriate field hockey players
Irish expatriate sportspeople in the Netherlands
Female field hockey forwards
Sportspeople from Dublin (city)
Irish women lawyers
21st-century Irish lawyers
Alumni of University College Dublin
21st-century women lawyers
Field hockey players at the 2020 Summer Olympics
Olympic field hockey players of Ireland